Life in the Snow is a 2016 British television show created by the BBC Natural History Unit.

Episodes

References

External links
 

BBC high definition shows
2016 British television series debuts
2016 British television series endings
BBC television documentaries
Discovery Channel original programming